"Constellations" is the debut single from alternative band Darwin Deez. It was released in early December 2009 as a digital download and also features on the self-titled debut album: "Darwin Deez". The single was used at the beginning of 90210's second-season finale: Confessions. The single was selected to be the Weekend Anthem by BBC Radio 1 DJ, Reggie Yates which ran from 23–24 October 2010.

Track listing
Digital Download

Digital Bundle

Chart performance
Although the single did not chart in the UK upon initial release, "Constellations" did debut at number 31 on the UK Indie Chart on 17 October 2010, the week prior to the re-release. On 24 October, the single climbed 16 places on the Indie Chart to number 15; but also debuted at number 174 on the UK Singles Chart.

Release history

References

2009 singles
2009 songs
Darwin Deez songs